Anopinella mariana is a species of moth of the family Tortricidae. It is found in Guatemala.

The length of the forewings is about 10.2 mm, making it one of the largest species in the genus.

External links
Systematic revision of Anopinella Powell (Lepidoptera: Tortricidae: Euliini) and phylogenetic analysis of the Apolychrosis group of genera

Anopinella
Moths described in 2003
Moths of Central America